The General Precision Equipment Corporation was a major manufacturing company involved in the defense and space industries as well educational products and control devices for consumer goods. General Precision, Inc., was the principal operating subsidiary of General Precision Equipment Corp. headquartered in Tarrytown, New York. 

Librascope, founded in 1937 by Lewis W. Imm to build and operate theater equipment, was acquired by General Precision in 1941.  During World War II it worked on improving  aircraft load balancing.  In the mid-1950s it went on to become an early digital computer manufacturer. In 1954 GPE purchased Griscom-Russell. In 1955 GPE Corporation purchased the Kearfott Company. In 1968 GPE Corporation was purchased by the Singer Company. In 1987 Kearfott was split, the Kearfott Guidance & Navigation Corporation was sold to the Astronautics Corporation of America in 1988 and the Electronic Systems Division was purchased by GEC-Marconi in 1990 and renamed GEC-Marconi Electronic Systems.

Companies based in Westchester County, New York
Tarrytown, New York